Aleksandr Vladimirovich Sayun (born 1 January 1975) is a former Uzbekistani professional footballer. He also holds Russian citizenship.

Club career
He made his debut in the Russian Premier League in 1998 for FC Torpedo Moscow.

Honours
 Uzbek League champion: 1994, 1997.

External links
 

1975 births
People from Surxondaryo Region
Living people
Uzbekistani people of Russian descent
Soviet footballers
Uzbekistani footballers
Uzbekistan international footballers
FC Torpedo Moscow players
FC Torpedo-2 players
FC Elista players
FC Amkar Perm players
FC Lokomotiv Nizhny Novgorod players
Russian Premier League players
FC Mordovia Saransk players
Association football midfielders
Footballers at the 1998 Asian Games
Asian Games competitors for Uzbekistan
FC Spartak Nizhny Novgorod players
FC Dynamo Kirov players